Christopher Belt is a Democratic member of the Illinois Senate for the 57th district. The 57th District, located in the Metro East region includes all or parts of Freeburg, Belleville, East St. Louis, O'Fallon, Madison, Fairview Heights, Shiloh, and Scott Air Force Base.

Belt was previously the President of the Board of Education for Cahokia Unit School District 187.

As of July 2022, Senator Belt is a member of the following Illinois Senate committees:

 (Chairman of) Appropriations - Education Committee (SAPP-SAED)
 Criminal Law Committee (SCCL)
 (Chairman of) Education Committee (SESE)
 Energy and Public Utilities Committee (SENE)
 Insurance Committee (SINS)
 (Chairman of) Insurance Mandates Committee (SINS-INMD)
 Labor Committee (SLAB)
 Licensed Activities Committee (SLIC)
 (Chairman of) Licensed Activities - Special Issues Committee (SLIC-SLSI)
 Redistricting - Southern Illinois Committee (SRED-SRSI)
 (Chairman of) Redistricting - Southwestern Illinois Committee (SRED-SRSW)
 Transportation Committee (STRN)

References

External links
 Christopher Belt for Senate official campaign site

Year of birth missing (living people)
Living people
21st-century American politicians
African-American state legislators in Illinois
School board members in Illinois
Democratic Party Illinois state senators
People from Cahokia, Illinois
21st-century African-American politicians